The following lists events that happened during 1943 in Australia.

Incumbents

Monarch – George VI
Governor-General – Alexander Hore-Ruthven, 1st Baron Gowrie
Prime Minister – John Curtin
Chief Justice – Sir John Latham

State Premiers
Premier of New South Wales – William McKell
Premier of Queensland – Frank Cooper
Premier of South Australia – Thomas Playford IV
Premier of Tasmania – Robert Cosgrove
Premier of Victoria – Albert Dunstan (until 14 September), then John Cain I (until 18 September), then Albert Dunstan
Premier of Western Australia – John Willcock

State Governors
Governor of New South Wales – John Loder, 2nd Baron Wakehurst
Governor of Queensland – Sir Leslie Orme Wilson
Governor of South Australia – Sir Malcolm Barclay-Harvey
Governor of Tasmania – Sir Ernest Clark
Governor of Victoria – Sir Winston Dugan
Governor of Western Australia – none appointed

Events
3 March – A Soviet embassy is established in Canberra, and an Australian diplomat is posted to Moscow as ambassador.
14 May – The hospital ship AHS Centaur is torpedoed by a Japanese submarine off North Stradbroke Island in Queensland, killing 268 persons.
12 June – A general election is held in Victoria.
21 August – A federal election is held. The incumbent Australian Labor Party government led by John Curtin is returned to power.
23 September – Enid Lyons and Dorothy Tangney become the first women to win seats in the Parliament of Australia. Lyons represents the Tasmanian electorate of Darwin in the House of Representatives, and Tangney is a Senator for Western Australia.
 27 December – 7 people are injured in Seaspray, Victoria after a wire on an RAAF plane fails to retract.

Arts and literature

 William Dobell wins the Archibald Prize with his portrait of Joshua Smith

Film
4 March – Damien Parer wins Australia's first Academy Award (Best Documentary Feature) for the film Kokoda Front Line.

Sport
 4 September – Newtown win the 1943 NSWRFL season, defeating North Sydney 34–7 in the premiership final. Canterbury-Bankstown finish in last place on points difference, claiming the wooden spoon.
 Dark Felt wins the Melbourne Cup

Births

 5 January – Mary Gaudron, High Court judge
 9 January – Robert Drewe, journalist and writer
 29 January – Molly Meldrum, journalist, critic, and producer
 8 February – Malcolm Donnelly, opera singer
 1 March – Dyson Heydon, High Court judge
 12 March – Philip Ruddock, politician
 14 March – Aila Keto, environmentalist
 19 March – Vern Schuppan, racing driver
 22 March – Brian Austin, politician
 6 April – Chris Gallus, politician
 9 April – Brian James, rugby league player (died 2020)
 11 April – Judith Adams, Liberal Senator for South Australia (died 2012)
 26 April – David Combe, political lobbyist (died 2019)
 29 April – John Tranter, poet
 30 April – Paul Jennings, children's author
 2 May
 Geoffrey Edelsten, medical entrepreneur (died 2021)
 John Goss, racing driver
 7 May 
 John Bannon, Premier of South Australia (1982–1992) (died 2015)
 Peter Carey, novelist
 17 May – Johnny Warren (died 2004), soccer player and coach
 19 May – Bob Graham, NSW politician
 1 June – Ian King, cricketer
 4 June – John Burgess, TV & radio host (Wheel of Fortune & Burgo's Catch Phrase)
 11 June – Ray Warren, rugby league commentator 
 19 June – Barry Hill, historian and writer
 3 July – Judith Durham, singer (The Seekers) (died 2022)
 11 July – Richard Carleton, television journalist (died 2006)
 25 July – Desmond Mueller, Vice Chief of the Defence Force (2000–2002)
 26 July – Robyn Woodhouse, high jumper
 18 August – Jean Roberts, Olympic shot putter and discus thrower
 5 September – Jack Charles, actor and Aboriginal elder (died 2022)
 16 September 
Bob Debus, politician
Alan Ferguson, Liberal Senator for South Australia
 26 September – Ian Chappell, cricketer
 4 October – Owen Davidson, tennis player
 6 October – Peter Dowding, Premier of Western Australia (1988–1990)
 9 October – Dianne Burge, Olympic sprinter
 6 November – Ian Turpie (died 2012), TV host & singer (The New Price Is Right)
 8 November – Peter Cook (died 2005), politician
 23 November – Tony Bonner, actor
 25 November – Jan Andrew, Olympic swimmer
 29 November – Janet Holmes à Court, businesswoman
 19 December – Jimmy Mackay, soccer player (died 1998)

Deaths

 3 January – Sir Walter James, 5th Premier of Western Australia (b. 1863)
 8 January – Richard Hillary, fighter pilot and author (died in the United Kingdom) (b. 1919)
 14 February – Alice Henry, suffragist, journalist and trade unionist (b. 1857)
 7 March – Alma Moodie, violinist and educator (died in Germany) (b. 1898)
 28 March – Keith Truscott, Australian rules footballer (Melbourne) and fighter pilot (b. 1916)
 29 March – William Ellis Newton, soldier and Victoria Cross recipient (died in New Guinea) (b. 1919)
 25 April – Sir Arthur Cocks, New South Wales politician (b. 1862)
 19 May – Billy Sing, soldier (b. 1886)
 25 May – Albert Robinson, South Australian politician (b. 1877)
 14 June – John McNeill, Victorian politician (b. 1868)
 28 June – Pietro Porcelli, sculptor (born in Italy) (b. 1872)
 21 July 
 Edward Riley, New South Wales politician (born in the United Kingdom) (b. 1859)
 David O'Keefe, Tasmanian politician (b. 1864)
 6 August – Tom Garrett, cricketer (b. 1858)
 20 August – Sir William Irvine, 21st Premier of Victoria and 5th Chief Justice of Victoria (born in Ireland) (b. 1858)
 1 September – Sir Arthur Streeton, artist (b. 1867)
 23 September – John Bradfield, engineer (b. 1867)
 2 October – Sir John Evans, 21st Premier of Tasmania (born in the United Kingdom) (b. 1855)
 14 October – Jimmy Matthews, cricketer (b. 1884)
 15 October – Thomas Henry Dodds, soldier (born in the United Kingdom) (b. 1873)
 23 October – Sir George Fairbairn, Victorian politician (b. 1855)
 6 November – William Lister Lister, artist (b. 1859)
 9 November – Reginald Spencer Browne, soldier, journalist and newspaper editor (b. 1856)
 22 November – Thomas Ryan, trade unionist and politician (born in Ireland) (b. 1870)
 23 November – Ernie Jones, cricketer and Australian rules footballer (Port Adelaide) (b. 1869)
 27 November – Louis Esson, poet and playwright (born in the United Kingdom) (b. 1878)
 10 December – Frederick Chapman, palaeontologist (born in the United Kingdom) (b. 1864)

See also
 List of Australian films of the 1940s

References

 
Australia
Years of the 20th century in Australia